If I Can Dream is a compilation album by American singer Elvis Presley. It was released on October 30, 2015 by RCA Records and Legacy Recordings. The album features archival vocal recordings of Presley accompanied by new orchestral arrangements by the Royal Philharmonic Orchestra. It also features duets with Canadian singer Michael Bublé and Italian trio Il Volo. If I Can Dream was recorded at Abbey Road Studios in London, England, and it was produced by Nick Patrick and Don Reedman, with piano orchestration (and assistant musical director duties on the accompanying world tour) by Dominic Ferris.

The album debuted at number one in the United Kingdom, giving Presley a record-equalling 12th UK number one. As of September 2016, the album had sold 1.6 million copies worldwide. A second album featuring the Royal Philharmonic Orchestra, The Wonder of You was released on October 21, 2016.

The project was backed by Priscilla Presley, who participated in the proceedings and was co-executive producer of the album. The If I Can Dream UK arena tour included the Czech Symphony Orchestra for the European Tour and Memphis Symphony Orchestra for the USA anniversary tour. It culminated with a performance at Graceland with Priscilla Presley for the Elvis 40th Anniversary celebration

Background

If I Can Dream was released in commemoration of Presley's 80th birthday celebration throughout 2015. In an interview with Rolling Stone, Elvis's ex-wife Priscilla Presley, said the vision of the album was to keep Elvis relevant: "Our culture and music has changed so drastically, I think that we have to keep [Elvis] right in line and do whatever we can to keep him current". Priscilla Presley also said the album is carrying the "DNA of Elvis Presley and keeping him authentic". The album was named after Elvis's 1968 single of the same name. Presley continued: "This would be a dream come true for Elvis. He would have loved to play with such a prestigious symphony orchestra. The music...the force that you feel with his voice and the orchestra is exactly what he would have done."

Commercial performance 
After debuting at number 1 in the UK, If I Can Dream tied Presley with Madonna for the most UK number-one albums by a solo artist, with each having 12. It is also Presley's 50th album to hit the UK top 10, and 59 years since his first number-one album on the chart, also a record. It sold 79,000 units in its first week at number one. It became the year's top selling album by a non UK artist, the top three being Adele's 25, Ed Sheeran's x and Sam Smith's In the Lonely Hour. On January 5, 2016, The Independent reported that the album was the 12th best-selling home entertainment title of 2015, which, along with the tremendous success of the aforementioned Adele and Sheeran albums, helped drive a 4% increase in UK music sales with respect of those of 2014. As of October 2016, If I Can Dream had sold 1,062,457 copies in the UK.

In the United States, the album debuted and peaked at number 21 on the Billboard 200 after having entered the Billboard Classical Chart at number 17 the previous week. Due to the inclusion of the Royal Philharmonic Orchestra, this marked the first time a Presley record had entered that chart. It then jumped from #17 to #1 in its second week and held that position in its third week,  while then successively remaining inside the top 15 positions for the next forty eight weeks. As of September 2016, the album had sold nearly 100,000 copies in the United States.

If I Can Dream debuted at number 3 on the New Zealand Albums Chart and entered at number 1 in both the Scottish and Australian album charts. In the former, he remained in the first three positions for the next seven weeks, returning to number 1 in the ninth. In the latter, it held the top spot for a second week, became Presley's second chart-topping album after ELV1S: 30 No. 1 Hits in 2002 and by December 31 had become the 11th biggest album seller of 2015.

Track listing

Charts and certifications

Weekly charts

Year-end charts

Decade-end charts

Certifications

See also
 List of number-one albums of 2015 (Australia)
 List of number-one albums of 2015 in the United Kingdom

References 

2015 compilation albums
Elvis Presley compilation albums
RCA Records compilation albums
Legacy Recordings compilation albums
Orchestral pop albums
Royal Philharmonic Orchestra albums
Albums produced by Nick Patrick (record producer)
Compilation albums published posthumously
Priscilla Presley